Teri Weigel is an American pornographic actress, fashion and nude model and Playboy Playmate.

Early life
Weigel was born in Fort Lauderdale, Florida and grew up in Deerfield Beach, Florida. She began modeling while in her teens, appearing in the Saks Fifth Avenue catalog among other venues.

Career
Weigel appeared on the cover of the November 1985 issue of Playboy, and was the Playboy Playmate for April 1986. She also appeared in a number of Playboy videos. She subsequently had several minor roles in mainstream film, including Predator 2 and Marked for Death, and made several appearances as "Jade" on Married... with Children. She was the second Playmate to also appear in Penthouse magazine, after Ursula Buchfellner, November 1985. She worked for a time at the Bunny Ranch Nevada brothel until September 1998.

Weigel was in a car accident in August 1990, in which she suffered severe neck and back injuries that required five operations.
Unable to work for four months due to her injuries, she and her husband, Murrill Maglio, were forced to sell their home and move into an apartment. During production on a nude video that was one of Weigel's last projects for Playboy, a co-worker suggested doing adult movies to earn money. Initially dismissive of the idea, Weigel eventually reconsidered. Weigel and Maglio spoke to their neighbors, Fred and Patti Lincoln, who produced adult films.

Her first film was Inferno in 1991, in which she costarred with Marc Wallice. According to Weigel and Maglio, they do not see Weigel's sexual intercourse with other men as a problem because of the security of their relationship. Maglio has had minor, non-sexual roles in some of her films. To enhance her career viability, Weigel underwent breast augmentation, enlarging her breasts to 36DD. After she became the first Playboy Playmate to cross over into porn, the publisher terminated its relationship with her, as Playmates who do porn are not allowed to represent the company. Weigel's new career also hurt her relationship with her family, as her parents stopped speaking to her by 1992.

In 2000, Playboy sued Weigel over her use of the Playboy logo on her website.

Awards
1992 FOXE Award – Vixen
2002 XRCO Hall of Fame
2003 AVN Hall of Fame
2003 NightMoves Award – Best Feature Dancer (Editor's Choice)

Personal life
Weigel married Murrill Maglio in December 1986.  Maglio died on June 4, 2015, at the age of 63.

Selected filmography

References

External links

Year of birth uncertain
American female adult models
American pornographic film actresses
American film actresses
American television actresses
Deerfield Beach High School alumni
Living people
Actresses from Fort Lauderdale, Florida
1980s Playboy Playmates
Pornographic film actors from Florida
People from Deerfield Beach, Florida
1960s births
21st-century American women